The North Carolina General Assembly of 2007–2008 consisted of the North Carolina House of Representatives and the North Carolina Senate that met in Raleigh, North Carolina in 2007 and 2008.  Members of the House and Senate were elected on November 7, 2006.  This legislature first convened in January 2007.  In addition to its regular sessions, the legislature met in special session in March 2008 to consider expelling Representative Thomas E. Wright.

House of Representatives
The North Carolina state House of Representatives, during the 2007–2008 session, consisted of 68 Democrats and 52 Republicans.

House leaders

Clerk (appointed by the house): Denise Weeks

House members

 District 1: William C. Owens, Jr. (Dem) – Camden, Currituck, Gates, Pasquotank 
 District 2: Timothy L. Spear (Dem) – Chowan, Dare, Gates, Perquimans, Tyrrell 
 District 3: Alice Graham Underhill (Dem) – Craven, Pamlico 
 District 4: Russell E. Tucker (Dem) – Craven, Martin, Pitt 
 District 5: Howard J. Hunter, Jr. (Dem), Died, Replaced by Annie Mobley (Dem) – Bertie, Hertford, Northampton
 District 6: Arthur J. Williams (Dem) – Beaufort, Hyde, Washington
 District 7: Edward Jones (Dem), Appointed to Senate, Replaced by Angela Bryant (Dem) – Halifax, Nash
 District 8: Edith D. Warren (Dem) – Greene, Martin, Pitt 
 District 9: Marian N. McLawhorn (Dem) – Pitt 
 District 10: Van Braxton (Dem) – Duplin, Lenoir
 District 11: Louis M. Pate, Jr. (Rep) – Wayne 
 District 12: William L. Wainwright (Dem) – Craven, Jones, Lenoir
 District 13: Pat McElraft (Rep) – Carteret, Onslow 
 District 14: George G. Cleveland (Rep) – Onslow 
 District 15: W. Robert Grady (Rep) – Onslow 
 District 16: Carolyn H. Justice (Rep) – New Hanover, Pender
 District 17: Bonner L. Stiller (Rep) – Brunswick, New Hanover 
 District 18: Thomas E. Wright (Dem), Expelled on March 20, 2008, replaced by Sandra Spaulding Hughes (Dem)  – Brunswick, Columbus, New Hanover  
 District 19: Daniel F. McComas (Rep) – New Hanover 
 District 20: Dewey L. Hill (Dem) – Brunswick, Columbus
 District 21: Larry M. Bell (Dem) – Duplin, Sampson, Wayne
 District 22: William Brisson (Dem) – Bladen, Sampson
 District 23: Joe P. Tolson (Dem) – Edgecombe, Wilson 
 District 24: Jean Farmer-Butterfield (Dem) – Edgecombe, Wilson 
 District 25: William G. Daughtridge, Jr. (Rep) – Nash
 District 26: N. Leo Daughtry (Rep) – Johnston, Wayne 
 District 27: Michael H. Wray (Dem) – Granville, Vance, Warren 
 District 28: James H. Langdon, Jr. (Rep) – Johnston 
 District 29: Larry D. Hall (Dem) – Durham
 District 30: Paul Luebke (Dem) – Durham 
 District 31: Henry M. Michaux, Jr. (Dem) – Durham 
 District 32: James W. Crawford, Jr. (Dem) – Durham, Granville, Vance
 District 33: Daniel T. Blue, Jr. (Dem) – Wake 
 District 34: Grier Martin (Dem) – Wake 
 District 35: Jennifer Weiss (Dem) – Wake 
 District 36: Nelson Dollar (Rep) – Wake 
 District 37: Paul Stam (Rep) – Wake 
 District 38: Deborah K. Ross (Dem) – Wake 
 District 39: Linda Coleman (Dem) – Wake 
 District 40: Marilyn Avila (Rep) – Wake 
 District 41: Ty Harrell (Dem) – Wake 
 District 42: Marvin W. Lucas (Dem) – Cumberland, 
 District 43: Mary E. McAllister (Dem) – Cumberland
 District 44: Margaret H. Dickson (Dem) – Cumberland
 District 45: Rick Glazier (Dem) – Cumberland
 District 46: Douglas Y. Yongue (Dem) – Hoke, Robeson, Scotland
 District 47: Ronnie N. Sutton (Dem) – Hoke, Robeson 
 District 48: Garland E. Pierce (Dem) – Hoke, Robeson, Scotland 
 District 49: Lucy T. Allen (Dem) – Franklin, Halifax, Nash 
 District 50: Bill Faison (Dem) – Caswell', Orange 
 District 51: Jimmy L. Love, Sr. (Dem) – Harnett, Lee, 
 District 52: Joe Boylan (Rep) – Moore District 53: David R. Lewis (Rep) – Harnett District 54: Joe Hackney (Dem) – Chatham, Orange, Moore District 55: Winkie Wilkins (Dem) – Durham, Person District 56: Verla C. Insko (Dem) – Orange District 57: Pricey Harrison (Dem) – Guilford 
 District 58: Alma S. Adams (Dem) – Guilford 
 District 59: Maggie Jeffus (Dem) – Guilford 
 District 60: Earl Jones (Dem) – Guilford 
 District 61: Laura I. Wiley (Rep) – Guilford 
 District 62: John M. Blust (Rep) – Guilford 
 District 63: Alice L. Bordsen (Dem) – Alamance 
 District 64: Cary D. Allred (Rep) – Alamance 
 District 65: E. Nelson Cole (Dem) – Rockingham District 66: Melanie Wade Goodwin (Dem) – Montgomery, Richmond District 67: David Almond (Rep), Resigned July 12, 2007, Replaced by Kenny Furr (Rep)  – Montgomery, Stanly, Union District 68: J. Curtis Blackwood, Jr. (Rep) – Union District 69: Pryor A. Gibson, III (Dem) – Anson, Montgomery, Union District 70: Pat B. Hurley (Rep) – Randolph District 71: Larry W. Womble (Dem) – Forsyth 
 District 72: Earline W. Parmon (Dem) – Forsyth District 73: Larry R. Brown (Rep) – Forsyth District 74: Dale Folwell (Rep) – Forsyth District 75: William C. McGee (Rep) – Forsyth District 76: Fred F. Steen, II (Rep) – Rowan District 77: Lorene T. Coates (Dem) – Rowan District 78: Harold J. Brubaker (Rep) – Randolph District 79: Julia C. Howard (Rep) – Davidson, Davie, Iredell District 80: Jerry C. Dockham (Rep) – Davidson 
 District 81: L. Hugh Holliman (Dem) – Davidson 
 District 82: Jeff Barnhart (Rep) – Cabarrus District 83: Linda P. Johnson (Rep) – Cabarrus District 84: Phillip D. Frye (Rep) – Avery, Caldwell, Mitchell 
 District 85: Mitch Gillespie (Rep) – Burke, Caldwell, McDowell District 86: Walter G. Church, Sr. (Dem) – Burke District 87: Edgar V. Starnes (Rep) – Alexander, Caldwell 
 District 88: Ray Warren (Dem) – Alexander, Catawba District 89: Mitchell S. Setzer (Rep) – Catawba District 90: James A. Harrell, III (Dem) – Alleghany, Surry District 91: Bryan R. Holloway (Rep) –  Stokes, Rockingham District 92: George M. Holmes (Rep) – Forsyth, Yadkin District 93: Cullie Tarleton (Dem) – Ashe, Watauga District 94: R. Tracy Walker (Rep) – Wilkes District 95: Karen B. Ray (Rep) – Catawba, Iredell District 96:  Mark K. Hilton (Rep) – Catawba District 97: Joe L. Kiser (Rep) – Lincoln District 98: Thom Tillis (Rep) – Mecklenburg 
 District 99: Drew P. Saunders (Dem) – Mecklenburg 
 District 100: James B. Black (Dem); Resigned, replaced by Tricia Cotham (Dem) – Mecklenburg 
 District 101: Beverly M. Earle (Dem) – Mecklenburg 
 District 102: Becky Carney (Dem) – Mecklenburg 
 District 103: Jim Gulley (Rep) – Mecklenburg 
 District 104: Ruth Samuelson (Rep) – Mecklenburg District 105: Ric Killian (Rep) – Mecklenburg District 106: Martha B. Alexander (Dem) – Mecklenburg 
 District 107: W. Pete Cunningham (Dem), resigned December 31, 2007, replaced by Kelly M. Alexander, Jr. (Dem) – Mecklenburg 
 District 108: Wil Neumann (Rep) – Gaston District 109: William A. Current (Rep) – Gaston District 110: Debbie A. Clary (Rep) – Cleveland, Gaston District 111: Tim Moore (Rep) – Cleveland 
 District 112: Bobby F. England (Dem) – Cleveland, Rutherford District 113: Trudi Walend (Rep) – Henderson, Polk, Transylvania District 114: Susan C. Fisher (Dem) – Buncombe 
 District 115: D. Bruce Goforth (Dem) – Buncombe 
 District 116: Charles C. Thomas (Rep) – Buncombe 
 District 117: Carolyn K. Justus (Rep) – Henderson, Transylvania District 118: Ray Rapp (Dem) – Haywood, Madison, Yancey District 119: R. Phillip Haire (Dem) – Haywood, Jackson, Macon, Swain District 120: Roger West (Rep) – Cherokee, Clay, Graham, MaconSenate
The North Carolina state Senate, during the 2007–2008 session, consisted of 31 Democrats and 19 Republicans.

Senate leaders

Clerk (appointed by the Senate): Janet Pruitt
 Permanent Democratic Caucus Chair: R. C. Soles, Jr. (8th district)
 Democratic Caucus Secretary: Charles W. Albertson (10th district)
 Chairman, Republican Policy Committee:  Jean Preston (2nd district)

Senate members

 District 1: Marc Basnight (Dem) – Beaufort, Camden, Currituck, Dare, Hyde, Pasquotank, Tyrrell, Washington 
 District 2: Jean R. Preston (Rep) – Carteret, Craven, Pamlico District 3: Clark Jenkins (Dem) – Edgecombe, Martin, Pitt District 4: Robert Lee Holloman (Dem), Died, Replaced by Edward Jones  (Dem) – Gates, Halifax, Hertford, Northampton, Bertie, Chowan, Perquimans
 District 5: John H. Kerr III (Dem) – Greene, Pitt, Wayne
 District 6: Harry Brown (Rep) – Jones, Onslow
 District 7: Doug Berger (Dem) – Franklin, Granville, Vance, Warren
 District 8: R. C. Soles, Jr. (Dem) – Brunswick, Columbus, Pender
 District 9: Julia Boseman (Dem) – New Hanover
 District 10: Charles W. Albertson (Dem) – Duplin, Harnett, Sampson
 District 11: A. B. Swindell (Dem) – Franklin, Nash, Vance
 District 12: Fred Smith (Rep) – Johnston, Wayne
 District 13: David F. Weinstein (Dem) – Hoke, Robeson
 District 14: Vernon Malone (Dem) – Wake
 District 15: Neal Hunt (Rep) – Wake
 District 16: Janet Cowell (Dem) – Wake
 District 17: Richard Stevens (Rep) – Wake
 District 18: Bob Atwater (Dem) – Durham, Chatham, Lee
 District 19: Tony Rand (Dem) – Bladen, Cumberland
 District 20: Jeanne Hopkins Lucas (Dem), Died March 9, 2007, Replaced by Floyd McKissick, Jr. (Dem) – Durham
 District 21: Larry Shaw (Dem) – Cumberland
 District 22: Harris Blake (Rep) – Harnett, Lee, Moore
 District 23: Eleanor Kinnaird (Dem) – Chatham, Orange, Person
 District 24: Anthony Foriest (Dem) – Alamance, Caswell
 District 25: William R. Purcell (Dem) – Anson, Richmond, Scotland, Stanly
 District 26: Phil Berger (Rep) – Guilford, Rockingham
 District 27: Kay Hagan (Dem) – Guilford
 District 28: Katie G. Dorsett (Dem) – Guilford
 District 29: Jerry W. Tillman (Rep) – Montgomery, Randolph
 District 30: Donald East (Rep) – Stokes, Surry, Yadkin
 District 31: Peter Brunstetter (Rep)  – Forsyth
 District 32: Linda Garrou (Dem) – Forsyth
 District 33: Stan Bingham (Rep) – Davidson, Guilford
 District 34: Andrew C. Brock (Rep) – Davie, Rowan, Yadkin
 District 35: W. Edward Goodall (Rep) – Mecklenburg, Union
 District 36: Fletcher L. Hartsell, Jr. (Rep) – Cabarrus, Rowan
 District 37: Daniel G. Clodfelter (Dem) – Mecklenburg
 District 38: Charlie Smith Dannelly (Dem) – Mecklenburg
 District 39: Robert Pittenger (Rep), resigned, replaced by Robert A. Rucho (Rep) – Mecklenburg
 District 40: Malcolm Graham (Dem) – Mecklenburg
 District 41: James Forrester (Rep) – Alexander, Iredell
 District 42: Austin M. Allran (Rep) – Catawba, Gaston, Lincoln
 District 43: David W. Hoyle (Dem) – Gaston
 District 44: Jim Jacumin (Rep) – Burke, Caldwell
 District 45: Steve Goss (Dem) – Alexander, Ashe, Watauga, Wilkes
 District 46: Walter H. Dalton (Dem) – Cleveland, Rutherford
 District 47: Joe Sam Queen (Dem) – Avery, Haywood, Madison, McDowell, Mitchell, Yancey
 District 48: Tom Apodaca (Rep) – Buncombe, Henderson, Polk
 District 49:  Martin L. Nesbitt, Jr. (Dem)  – Buncombe
 District 50: John J. Snow, Jr. (Dem) – Cherokee, Clay, Graham, Haywood, Jackson, Macon, Swain, Transylvania

References

External links
NC General Assembly website (current legislature)

2007
General Assembly
General Assembly
 2007
 2007
2007 U.S. legislative sessions
2008 U.S. legislative sessions